Coleta is a village in Whiteside County, Illinois, United States. The population was 164 at the 2010 census, up from 155 in 2000.

Geography
Coleta is located at  (41.905566, -89.805016).

Demographics

As of the census of 2000, there were 155 people, 60 households, and 45 families residing in the village. The racial makeup of the village was 96.77% White, 1.29% African American, 0.65% Native American, and 1.29% from two or more races. Hispanic or Latino of any race were 3.23% of the population.

There were 60 households, out of which 36.7% had children under the age of 18 living with them, 61.7% were married couples living together, 10.0% had a female householder with no husband present, and 25.0% were non-families. 20.0% of all households were made up of individuals, and 5.0% had someone living alone who was 65 years of age or older. The average household size was 2.58 and the average family size was 3.00.

In the village, the population was spread out, with 27.1% under the age of 18, 5.2% from 18 to 24, 27.7% from 25 to 44, 26.5% from 45 to 64, and 13.5% who were 65 years of age or older. The median age was 39 years. For every 100 females, there were 101.3 males. For every 100 females age 18 and over, there were 101.8 males.

The median income for a household in the village was $40,000, and the median income for a family was $34,886. Males had a median income of $27,500 versus $20,469 for females. The per capita income for the village was $17,439. About 2.4% of families and 8.8% of the population were below the poverty line, including 5.7% of those under the age of eighteen and 7.4% of those 65 or over.

References

Villages in Illinois
Villages in Whiteside County, Illinois